Split Wide Open is a 1999 Indian film directed by Dev Benegal. It is his second feature film after English, August (1994). The film primarily deals with the Water conflicts in the slums of Bombay, and paedophilia, and also looks at the subversive sexuality in modern India and how the notions of morality are challenged when sex and poverty collide. The film came under harsh criticism when released in India and has been one of the most controversial Indian films.

Cast and characters
 Rahul Bose as KP (Kut-Price)
 Laila Rouass as Nandita
 Abhimanyu Sharma as Shiv
 Farida Haider Mulla as Didi
 Kiran Nagarkar as Brother Bono
 Rajika Puri as Auntie
 Ayesha Dharkar as Leela
 Virendra Saxena as Altaf
 Aadya Bedi

Awards and recognition
 The official selection at the 1999 Venice Film Festival.
 Awarded a Special Jury Award to the film and the Best Actor award (Rahul Bose) at the 2000 Singapore International Film Festival.
 Won the Grand Prix at the 2000 Belgium International Film Festival.
 Nominated for the Grand Prix at the 2000 Bratislava International Film Festival.

Soundtrack

The original soundtrack of the film consists of 12 total songs with 8 soundtrack songs and 5 instrumental tracks composed by Nitin Sawhney.

The film also credits Massive Attack, Nusrat Fateh Ali Khan, Bob Dylan, Mark Knopfler, Pink Floyd, Krome Assassins, Touch and Go, Purvi Parikh, the Dagar Brothers and Kishori Amonkar for their music used in the production of the film.

Notes

Poster Art & Design and Title Images by Artist  Jaideep Mehrotra

External links
 Film Overview
 Features
 
 
 NY Times Review
 Review at Variety.com

1999 films
English-language Indian films
Films about organised crime in India
Films about poverty in India
Films shot in Mumbai
Films set in Mumbai
Works about police brutality